26 Journal Square is a  high-rise in Jersey City, Hudson County, New Jersey, United States. It was originally known as the Labor Bank Building. It was completed in 1928 and has 15 floors. As of 2009, it was the 23rd tallest building in the city. It is often considered the first skyscraper in Jersey City. The Beaux Arts building was designed by John T. Rowland. It was added to the National Register of Historic Places on June 14, 1984, for its significance in architecture and commerce.

The building was originally headquarters of the Labor National Bank. The bank was affiliated with the Branleygran Company, and established by Theodore M. Brandle, a "labor czar" allied with Mayor of Jersey City Frank Hague. Hague channeled construction projects towards the construction bond underwriter, including the Pulaski Skyway. Essentially,  Brandle controlled any construction projects in northern New Jersey, and any strikes he might call would be backed by Hague's police.

See also
List of tallest buildings in Jersey City
National Register of Historic Places listings in Hudson County, New Jersey

References

Skyscraper office buildings in Jersey City, New Jersey
Office buildings completed in 1928
Bank buildings on the National Register of Historic Places in New Jersey
National Register of Historic Places in Hudson County, New Jersey
1928 establishments in New Jersey
New Jersey Register of Historic Places
Beaux-Arts architecture in New Jersey